Konyukhovo or Konyukhovskaya is the name of several rural localities (villages) in Russia
 Konyukhovo, Vladimir Oblast, a village in Alexandrovsky District, Vladimir Oblast
 Konyukhovo, Ustyuzhensky District, Vologda Oblast, a village in Ustyuzhensky District, Vologda Oblast
 Konyukhovo, Vologodsky District, Vologda Oblast, a village in Vologodsky District, Vologda Oblast
 Konyukhovskaya, a village in Tarnogsky District, Vologda Oblast

See also 
 Konyukhov, a surname
 Konyukhi, a settlement in Altai Krai